The Primetime Emmy Award for Outstanding Stunt Coordination and Outstanding Stunt Performance are awarded to one television program each year.

Between 2013 and 2020, comedy or variety and dramas or limited series programs competed in a separate category for stunt coordination. The awards were consolidated prior to 2013 and again starting in 2021. A new award for stunt performers was also created in 2021.

In the following list, the first titles listed in gold are the winners; those not in gold are nominees, which are listed in alphabetical order. The years given are those in which the ceremonies took place:



Winners and nominations

2000s

2010s
{| class="wikitable" style="width:100%"
|- bgcolor="#bebebe"
! width="5%" | Year
! width="25%" | Program
! width="25%" | Episode
! width="40%" | Nominee
! width="5%" | Network
|-
|rowspan=6 style="text-align:center" | 2010(62nd)
|- style="background:#FAEB86"
|FlashForward
| align=center| "No More Good Days"
|Danny Weselis
|ABC
|-
|Chuck
| align=center| "Chuck Versus the Tic Tac"|Merritt Yohnka
|NBC
|-
|House| align=center| "Brave Heart"
|Jim Vickers
|rowspan=3 | Fox
|-
|Human Target| align=center| "Run"
|Dean Choe
|-
|24| align=center| "Day 8: 6:00 p.m. – 7:00 p.m."
|Jeff David Cadiente
|-
|rowspan=5 style="text-align:center" | 2011(63rd)
|- style="background:#FAEB86"
|Southland| align=center| "Graduation Day"
|Peewee Piemonte
|TNT
|-
|Game of Thrones| align=center| "The Wolf and the Lion"
|Paul Jennings
|HBO
|-
|Hawaii Five-0| align=center| "Ua Hiki Mai Kapalena Pau"
|Jeff David Cadiente
|CBS
|-
|Spartacus: Gods of the Arena| align=center| "The Bitter End"
|Allan Poppleton
|Starz
|-
|rowspan=7 style="text-align:center" | 2012(64th)
|- style="background:#FAEB86"
|Southland| align=center| "Wednesday"
|Peewee Piemonte
|TNT
|-
|colspan=2|American Horror Story|Tim Davison
|FX
|-
|Criminal Minds| align=center| "The Bittersweet Science"
|Tom Elliott
|CBS
|-
|Grimm| align=center| "The Woman in Black"
|Matt Taylor
|NBC
|-
|Hawaii Five-0| align=center| "Kame'e"
|Jeff David Cadiente
|rowspan=2 | CBS
|-
|NCIS: Los Angeles| align=center| "Blye K"
|Troy James Brown
|-
| rowspan=10 style="text-align:center" | 2013(65th)
! colspan="6"| Outstanding Stunt Coordination for a Comedy Series or Variety Program
|- style="background:#FAEB86"
| colspan=2| Supah Ninjas| Hiro Koda
| Nickelodeon
|-
| colspan=2| It's Always Sunny in Philadelphia| Marc Scizak
| FX
|-
| colspan=2| Modern Family| Jim Sharp
| ABC
|-
| colspan=2| Workaholics| Jim Vickers
| Comedy Central
|-
! colspan="6"| Outstanding Stunt Coordination for a Drama Series, Limited Series or Movie
|- style="background:#FAEB86"
| Revolution| align=center| "Nobody's Fault But Mine"
| Jeff Wolfe
| NBC
|-
| Blue Bloods| align=center| "Secrets & Lies"
| Cort Hessler
| rowspan=2 | CBS
|-
| NCIS| align=center| "Revenge"
| Diamond Farnsworth
|-
| Southland| align=center| "Bleed Out"
| Peewee Piemonte
| TNT
|-
| rowspan=13 style="text-align:center" | 2014(66th)
! colspan="6"| Outstanding Stunt Coordination for a Comedy Series or Variety Program
|- style="background:#FAEB86"
| colspan=2| Brooklyn Nine-Nine| Norman Howell
| Fox
|-
| colspan=2| Community| Casey O'Neill
| NBC
|-
| colspan=2| It's Always Sunny in Philadelphia| Marc Scizak
| FX
|-
| colspan=2| Sam & Cat| Vince Deadrick Jr.
| Nickelodeon
|-
| colspan=2| Shameless| Julie Michaels
| Showtime
|-
! colspan="6"| Outstanding Stunt Coordination for a Drama Series, Limited Series or Movie
|- style="background:#FAEB86"
| colspan=2| The Blacklist| Cort L. Hessler III
| NBC
|-
| colspan=2| Game of Thrones| Paul Herbert
| HBO
|-
| colspan=2| Grimm| Matthew Taylor
| NBC
|-
| colspan=2| Hawaii Five-0| Jeff Cadiente
| CBS
|-
| colspan=2| Revolution| Jeff Wolfe
| NBC
|-
| colspan=2| True Blood| Hiro Koda
| HBO
|-
| rowspan=12 style="text-align:center" | 2015(67th)
! colspan="6"| Outstanding Stunt Coordination for a Comedy Series or Variety Program
|- style="background:#FAEB86"
| colspan=2| Brooklyn Nine-Nine| Norman Howell
| Fox
|-
| colspan=2| Community| Ben Scott
| Yahoo!
|-
| colspan=2| It's Always Sunny in Philadelphia| Marc Scizak
| FX
|-
| colspan=2| Saturday Night Live| Jeffrey Lee Gibson
| NBC
|-
| colspan=2| Unbreakable Kimmy Schmidt| Jill Brown
| Netflix
|-
! colspan="6"| Outstanding Stunt Coordination for a Drama Series, Limited Series or Movie
|- style="background:#FAEB86"
| colspan=2| Game of Thrones| Rowley Irlam
| HBO
|-
| colspan=2| The Blacklist| Cort L. Hessler III
| NBC
|-
| colspan=2| Boardwalk Empire| Christopher Place
| HBO
|-
| colspan=2| Sons of Anarchy| Eric Norris
| FX
|-
| colspan=2| The Walking Dead| Monty L. Simons
| AMC
|-
| rowspan=12 style="text-align:center" | 2016(68th)
! colspan="6"| Outstanding Stunt Coordination for a Comedy Series or Variety Program
|- style="background:#FAEB86"
| colspan=2| Shameless| Eddie Perez
| Showtime
|-
| colspan=2| Angie Tribeca| Erik Solky
| TBS
|-
| colspan=2| Brooklyn Nine-Nine| Norman Howell
| Fox
|-
| colspan=2| K.C. Undercover| Hiro Koda and Timothy Eulich
| Disney
|-
| colspan=2| Saturday Night Live| Brian Smyj
| NBC
|-
! colspan="6"| Outstanding Stunt Coordination for a Drama Series, Limited Series or Movie
|- style="background:#FAEB86"
| colspan=2| Game of Thrones| Rowley Irlam
| HBO
|-
| colspan=2| The Blacklist| Cort L. Hessler III
| NBC
|-
| colspan=2| Gotham| Norman Douglass
| Fox
|-
| colspan=2| Marvel's Daredevil| Philip J. Silvera
| Netflix
|-
| colspan=2| Rush Hour| Jeff Wolfe
| CBS
|-
| rowspan=12 style="text-align:center" | 2017(69th)
! colspan="6"| Outstanding Stunt Coordination for a Comedy Series or Variety Program
|- style="background:#FAEB86"
| colspan=2| Shameless| Eddie Perez
| Showtime
|-
| colspan=2| Angie Tribeca| Erik Solky
| TBS
|-
| colspan=2| Brooklyn Nine-Nine| Norman Howell
| Fox
|-
| colspan=2| Saturday Night Live| Brian Smyj
| NBC
|-
| colspan=2| Unbreakable Kimmy Schmidt| Jill Brown
| Netflix
|-
! colspan="6"| Outstanding Stunt Coordination for a Drama Series, Limited Series or Movie
|- style="background:#FAEB86"
| colspan=2| Marvel's Luke Cage| James Lew
| Netflix
|-
| colspan=2| The Blacklist| Cort L. Hessler III
| rowspan=2|NBC
|-
| colspan=2| Blindspot| Christopher Place
|-
| colspan=2| Gotham| Norman Douglass
| Fox
|-
| colspan=2| MacGyver| Jeff Wolfe
| CBS
|-
| rowspan=12 style="text-align:center" | 2018(70th)
! colspan="6"| Outstanding Stunt Coordination for a Comedy Series or Variety Program
|- style="background:#FAEB86"
| colspan=2| GLOW| Shauna Diggins
| Netflix
|-
| colspan=2| Brooklyn Nine-Nine| Norman Howell
| Fox
|-
| colspan=2| Cobra Kai| Hiro Koda
| YouTube
|-
| colspan=2| Saturday Night Live| Brian Smyj
| NBC
|-
| colspan=2| Shameless| Eddie Perez
| Showtime
|-
! colspan="6"| Outstanding Stunt Coordination for a Drama Series, Limited Series or Movie
|-style="background:#FAEB86"
| colspan=2| Game of Thrones| Rowley Irlam
| HBO
|-
| colspan=2| The Blacklist| Cort L. Hessler III
| rowspan=2|NBC
|-
| colspan=2| Blindspot| Christopher Place
|-
| colspan=2| Marvel's The Punisher| Thom Williams
| Netflix
|-
| colspan=2| Westworld| Doug Coleman and Brian Machleit
| HBO
|-
| rowspan=12 style="text-align:center" | 2019(71st)
! colspan="6"| Outstanding Stunt Coordination for a Comedy Series or Variety Program
|- style="background:#FAEB86"
| colspan=2| GLOW| Shauna Diggins
| Netflix
|-
| colspan=2| Barry| Wade Allen
| HBO
|-
| colspan=2| Cobra Kai| Hiro Koda and Jahnel Curfman
| YouTube
|-
| colspan=2| Russian Doll| Christopher Place
| Netflix
|-
| colspan=2| The Tick| Chris Cenatiempo
| Amazon
|-
! colspan="6"| Outstanding Stunt Coordination for a Drama Series, Limited Series or Movie
|-style="background:#FAEB86"
| colspan=2| Game of Thrones| Rowley Irlam
| HBO
|-
| colspan=2| The Blacklist| Cort L. Hessler III
| rowspan=2|NBC
|-
| colspan=2| Blindspot| Christopher Place
|-
| colspan=2| SEAL Team| Peewee Piemonte and Julie Michaels
| rowspan=2|CBS
|-
| colspan=2| S.W.A.T.| Charlie Brewer
|}

2020s

Programs with multiple awards for Outstanding Stunt Coordination

4 awards
 Game of Thrones3 awards
 Shameless2 awards
 Brooklyn Nine-Nine Chuck GLOW The Mandalorian Southland 24Programs with multiple nominations for Outstanding Stunt Coordination

8 nominations
 The Blacklist7 nominations
 246 nominations
 Brooklyn Nine-Nine Game of Thrones5 nominations
 Alias Shameless4 nominations
 Saturday Night Live3 nominations
 Blindspot Chuck Cobra Kai Criminal Minds Hawaii Five-0 It's Always Sunny in Philadelphia Southland S.W.A.T. Third Watch2 nominations
 Angie Tribeca Barry Community CSI: NY ER GLOW Gotham Grimm The Mandalorian NCIS Revolution Stranger Things Unbreakable Kimmy Schmidt''

References

Outstanding Stunts